Hi! Dharma! (literally "Hey Dharma Let's Play") is a 2001 South Korean comedy about gangsters who hide out in a monastery. With 3,746,000 admissions, it was the fifth highest-grossing Korean film of 2001.

A sequel titled Hi! Dharma 2: Showdown in Seoul was released in 2004.

Plot 
Five gangsters escape in a van after a bloody confrontation with the rival Chunno gang. They realize that they have a snitch in their own gang and that they can't get out of the country because the police will be looking for them.  So they go to the mountains and hide in a Buddhist monastery.

But the monks there don't want the gangsters as their guests.  They decide that if the gangsters can win three out of five contests, the gangsters can stay, but if they lose, they must leave immediately. The gangsters win enough contests, the last of them being suggested by the eldest monk: a challenge to fill up a broken water pot without plugging up the hole. The gangsters come up with the idea of putting the pot into the river. They are allowed to stay for a week.  But the younger monks still can't tolerate the gangsters, and attempt to persuade them to leave.

Meanwhile, the boss among the gangsters realizes who betrayed them but goes ahead and contacts him anyway, disclosing his location.  The former colleagues, now defected to the Chunno gang, show up near the monastery, dig a shallow mass grave and throw the gangsters they betrayed into it. But the monks come to the rescue of their unwanted guests.

Back at the monastery, both the monks and the gangsters are saddened to learn of the death of the eldest monk. After the funeral, the gangsters leave. Months later, they make varied donations to the monastery in gratitude for their hospitality.

Cast
Park Shin-yang ... Jae-gyu
Jung Jin-young ... Monk Jeong-myeong
Park Sang-myun ... Bul-kom
Kang Sung-jin ... Nal-chi
Kim Su-ro ... Wang Ku-ra
Hong Kyoung-in ... Rookie
Kim In-mun ... Master
Kim Young-moon
Lee Dae-yeon ... Chang-guen
Lee Mu-hyeon ... Dae-ho
Lee Moon-sik .. monk Dae-bong
Lee Won-jong ... monk Hyeon-gak
Im Hyun-kyung ... Yeun-hwa
Ryu Seung-soo ... Monk Myung-chun
Kwon Oh-min ... Boy monk

Trivia 
The male actors who played the monks and the only actress in the movie (Im Hyun-kyung), who played the nun Yeon-hwa, actually shaved their heads for the movie.

References

External links 
 
 
 

2001 films
2000s crime comedy films
South Korean action comedy films
Films about organized crime in South Korea
Films about Buddhism
2000s Korean-language films
Buddhism in Korea
2001 comedy films
2000s South Korean films